Francis Xavier Plessis, (born Quebec, 15 January 1694) was a clergyman in New France.

He became a member of the Society of Jesus, and practiced on First Nation missions. He wrote "Avis et Pratiques pour Profiter de la Mission et en Conserver le Fruit a l'Usage des Missions du Pere du la Compagnie de Jesus" (3 vols., Paris, 1742), and "Lettre au Sujet des Calomnie-Publiees par l'Auteur des Nouvelles Ecclesiasliques" (1745).

See also
St. Francis Xavier University

References

People of New France
1694 births
Year of death missing
18th-century Canadian Jesuits